Santo Pecora (born Santo Joseph Pecoraro, March 21, 1902 – May 29, 1984) was an American jazz trombonist known for his longtime association with the New Orleans jazz scene.

He was born in New Orleans, Louisiana, United States. Pecora changed his name because his cousin, a drummer, was also named Santo Pecoraro. The two sometimes performed in ensembles together. Pecora began on French horn but settled on trombone as a teenager. He played in orchestras accompanying silent films as well as with the bandleaders Johnny De Droit and Leon Roppolo. He toured with singer Bee Palmer early in the 1920s, then joined the New Orleans Rhythm Kings in the middle of the decade.

He moved to Chicago late in the decade, playing both in jazz bands and in theater palaces, then became a big band sideman in the 1930s. He toured with Sharkey Bonano in the 1930s, then played with Wingy Manone in California. In the 1940s he returned to New Orleans, where he continued working with Bonano in addition to regular gigs on riverboats and at nightclubs. He remained a staple of the local scene into the 1960s.

He died in May 1984, in his hometown, at the age of 82.

References

1902 births
1984 deaths
American jazz trombonists
Male trombonists
Jazz musicians from New Orleans
20th-century American musicians
20th-century trombonists
20th-century American male musicians
American male jazz musicians
New Orleans Rhythm Kings members
Southland Records artists